The Ministry of the Interior is one of the Finnish Government's twelve ministries and is responsible for matters related to internal security such as counter-terrorism, policing, fire & rescue services, and border control, as well as migration issues. The ministry is led by the Minister of the Interior, Krista Mikkonen of the Green League.

The Ministry of the Interior's budget for 2018 is €1,463,996,000. The ministry employs 190 people.

References 

 
Government of Finland
Interior